Lot 46 is a township in Kings County, Prince Edward Island, Canada.  It is part of East Parish. Lot 46 was awarded to Alexander Fordyce and Robert Gordon in the 1767 land lottery.

References

46
Geography of Kings County, Prince Edward Island